A theatre ballistic missile (TBM) is any ballistic missile with a range less than , used against targets "in-theatre". Its range is thus between that of tactical and intermediate-range ballistic missiles. The term is a relatively new one, encompassing the former categories of short-range ballistic missile and medium-range ballistic missile. Examples of this type of in-theatre missile are the Soviet RT-15, TR-1 Temp and American PGM-19 Jupiter missile, both from the 1960s.

Specific TBMs
Specific types of TBMs (current, past and under development) include:

 B-611 - 
 BP-12/A - 
 Type 621 - 
 Type 631 - 
 DF-11 - 
 DF-12/M20 - 
 DF-15 - 
 DF-2 - 
 DF-16 - 
 DF-17 - 
 DF-21 -  (China) , (Saudi Arabia) 

 Hadès - 

 Pluton - 
 SE.4200 - 
 SSBS S1

 Agni I - 
 K-15 - 
 Prahaar - 
 Pragati -  (planned)
 Pralay - 
 Pranash -  (planned)
 Prithvi I - 
 Prithvi II - 
 Prithvi III - 
 Shaurya - 

 Agni II - 
 Agni-P - 

 Fateh-110 - 
 Fateh-313 - 
 Fateh Mobin - 
 Naze'at - 
 Qiam 1 - 
 Ra'ad-500 - 
 Samen - 
 Shahab-1 - 
 Shahab-2 - 
 Tondar-69 - 
 Zelzal-1 - 
 Zelzal-2 - 
 Zelzal-3 - 
 Zolfaghar (missile)/Zulfiqar - 

 Ashoura - 
 Emad - 
 Fajr-3 - (estimation)
 Ghadr-110 - 
 Khorramshahr (missile) -  
 Sejjil - 
 Shahab-3 - 

 Al Abbas - 
 Al Fat'h - 
 Al Hussein - 
 Al Hijarah - 
 Al Samoud - 
 Badr-2000 - 

 Jericho I - 
 LORA - 
 Predator Hawk - 
 Jericho II - 

 Rheinbote - 
 V-2 missile - 

 Hwasong-5 - 
 Hwasong-6 - 
 Hwasong-7 - 
 Hwasong-11 - 
 KN-23 - 

 Hwasong-9 - 
 Hwasong-10/RD-B Musudan - 
 Pukkuksong-1 - 
 Pukkuksong-2 - 
 Pukkuksong-2 - 
 Rodong-1 - 

 Abdali - 
 Ghaznavi - 
 Hatf-I - 
 Hatf-IA - 
 Hatf-IB - 
 Nasr - 
 Shaheen - 
 Shaheen-1 - 
 Shaheen-1 A - 

 Ababeel - 
 Ghauri-I - 
 Ghauri-II - 
 Ghauri-III -  (Cancelled)
 Shaheen-II - 
 Shaheen-III - 

 Šumadija (multiple rocket launcher) - 

 Hyunmoo-1 - 
 Hyunmoo-2 - 
 Hyunmoo-4 - 
 KTSSM - 

/

 9K720 Iskander-M -  
 OTR-21 Tochka-U -  /
 OTR-23 Oka -  /
 R-1 - 
 R-2 -  
 Scud A-D -   
 TR-1 Temp -  

 R-5 Pobeda -  
 R-12 Dvina -  
 RT-15 -  

 Sky Spear - 
 Sky Horse - 

 BORA I - 
 BORA II - 
 J-600T Yıldırım I - 
 J-600T Yıldırım II - 
 J-600T Yıldırım III - 
 J-600T Yıldırım IV -  - under development

 Hrim-2 

 Long-Range Hypersonic Weapon - over 
 MGM-18 Lacrosse - 
 MGM-31 Pershing - 
 MGM-52 Lance - 
 MGM-140 ATACMS - 
 OpFires - ?
 PGM-11 Redstone - 
 Precision Strike Missile - 

 Pershing II 
 PGM-19 Jupiter 

 Burkan-1 (modified Scud) -  (Houthis)
 Burkan-2 (modified Scud) (Houthis) - 
 Qaher-1 (modified S-75 Dvina) -  (Houthis)
 Qaher-M2  (Houthis) -

See also 
 List of missiles
 Short-range ballistic missile
 Medium-range ballistic missile

References